CSI Immanuel church, Salem is located on  Sarada College Rd, in the heart of Salem, Tamil Nadu, India. The church services are conducted both in Tamil and English.

History

In May 1840 Rev. J.M. Lechler (Rev. John Michael Lechler - 1804 - 1861) called as the Apostle of Salem, a German Missionary of the London Missionary society came to salem from Coimbatore to take change of the Salem Mission work.  He had already been 5 Years in India of which 4 years were spent working with Rev.C. T. E. Rhenius(1790 - 1838) called as the Apostle of Tirunelveli). In the same year Rev . J.M. Lechler Started in Salem a School of Industries - First of its kind in the whole of the British India - The school was called as the first school of Industrial education in India and Rev . J.M. Lechler who was also called (because of the chequered history) as the father of Industrial education in India . To Develop the Industrial school Rev. J.M. Lechler needed more skilled workers and Artisans . So he called skilled workers from Tirunelveli under the Leadership of Catechist E. David of Palayamkottah (a well trained man under Rev. C.T.E. Rhenius of Tirunelveli ) under the Leadership of Catechist E. David 30 families of skilled workers from Tirunelveli came to salem.  They were given work according to their trades in the industrial school and accommodated in the Salem mission compound at Shevapet, Salem.

Church Committee
Present Committee has 9 pastorate committee and 4 DC members.

Administration
CSI Immanuel Church was vested with the Indian Ecclesiastical Establishment from Coimbatore.

Transfer to CSI
After Indian Independence, the Government of India, transferred the ownership of all Government churches to the Indian Church Trustees, Calcutta, as the absolute owners of all such Church properties in India. However, maintenance of the church is the responsibility of the local Diocese. Following formation of the Church of South India in September 1947, the Christ Church, came under the Diocese of Mysore. In 1950, the church was transferred to the newly formed Coimbatore Diocese. In 1963, the ownership of the churches held by the Indian Church Trustees, Calcutta, was transferred to Church of South India Trust Association. The chapel of the London Missionary Society also came under the control of the Church of South India

Present Times
At present, CSI Immanuel Church also has a Community Hall, the old Anglican Cemetery of Salem is also administered by this church. Recently, some renovations were undertaken.

References 

Church of South India church buildings in India
Salem, Tamil Nadu
Churches in Tamil Nadu